Sir Louis Henry Davies  (May 4, 1845May 1, 1924) was a Canadian lawyer, businessman and politician, and judge from the province of Prince Edward Island.  In a public career spanning six decades, he served as the third premier of Prince Edward Island, a federal Member of Parliament and Cabinet minister, and as both a Puisne Justice and the sixth Chief Justice of Canada.

Early life and family
Davies was born in Charlottetown, the son of Benjamin Davies and Kezia Attwood Watts.  He attended Prince of Wales College in Charlottetown.

In July, 1872, he married Susan Wiggins, a daughter of Dr. A. V. G. Wiggins. She was a member of the Humane Society, the Women's Canadian Historical Society, and similar organizations. The couple had two sons and three daughters.

Legal career
Davies read law at the Inner Temple in London. He was called to bar in England in 1866, and to the bar of Prince Edward Island a year later.  He served as lead counsel for the Prince Edward Island Land Commission, which was established in 1875 to settle the problem of absentee land ownership and to provide tenants of the Island with clear title to their lands.

In 1877, Davies was one of the Canadian counsel who appeared on behalf of the British Government before the Halifax Fisheries Commission, appointed under the Treaty of Washington (1871) to resolve outstanding issues, including fishing rights.  The Commission gave an award directing the United States to pay $5,500,000 to the British Government.

Davies was appointed Queen's Counsel in 1880, and knighted by Queen Victoria in 1897.

Political career
Davies was first elected to the House of Assembly as a Liberal in 1872 just prior to Prince Edward Island entering Canadian confederation. With the issue of Confederation resolved and the land question settled as a result of Canada's promise to fund land reform and the passage of the Land Purchase Act, the major issue remaining on the island was that of school funding and whether the school system should be entirely secular and public or whether separate schools for Catholics should be permitted. The issue divided both parties, and had led to the collapse of one government.

Following the defeat of the Conservative government of Lemuel Cambridge Owen in 1876, Davies established a coalition government of Protestant Liberals and Conservatives with himself as Premier and Attorney-General. The Davies government was formed to enact a Public Schools Act which made school attendance compulsory, and created a non-sectarian public school system. The act was passed in 1877 and, with the issue around which the coalition had been formed having been resolved, the coalition itself began to unravel. Davies' government reformed the civil service and brought in financial reforms before being defeated by the Conservatives in a Motion of No Confidence in 1879.

Davies won a seat in the House of Commons of Canada in the 1882 federal election as a Liberal.  When the Liberals formed government after the 1896 election under Sir Wilfrid Laurier, Davies became minister of marine and fisheries, and during 1898–1899 he was a member of the Anglo-American joint high commission at Quebec.

Supreme Court of Canada
In 1901, Davies was appointed to the Supreme Court of Canada. He was appointed Chief Justice in 1918. He was the oldest person to be appointed Chief Justice, at the age of 73 years, 172 days. Davies held the position until his death in Ottawa in 1924.

As of 2020, he is the last Chief Justice of Canada to have previously served in elected office. He is also, as of 2020, the only Prince Edward Islander to have served on the Supreme Court. The Prince Edward Island Supreme Court building in Charlottetown is named in his honour.  Also named for him is Davies Point, at the meeting of Hastings and Alice Arms on Observatory Inlet in British Columbia; the naming was done at the time of his appointment to the Supreme Court, as was also Davies Bay, at the head of Work Channel just east of Prince Rupert.

References

External links 

 
 
 Supreme Court of Canada biography

1845 births
1924 deaths
Canadian Anglicans
Canadian Knights Commander of the Order of St Michael and St George
Chief justices of Canada
Canadian King's Counsel
Liberal Party of Canada MPs
Members of the House of Commons of Canada from Prince Edward Island
Members of the King's Privy Council for Canada
People from Charlottetown
Premiers of Prince Edward Island
Prince Edward Island Liberal Party MLAs
Lawyers in Prince Edward Island
Canadian people of Welsh descent
Persons of National Historic Significance (Canada)
Prince Edward Island Liberal Party leaders
Canadian members of the Privy Council of the United Kingdom
Members of the Judicial Committee of the Privy Council